"Shots & Squats" is a song by Swedish DJ/music producing house music duo Vigiland featuring Tham Sway. It was released as a single on 8 June 2015. It peaked at number 2 in Sweden, number 3 in Finland and number 7 in Denmark.

Charts

Weekly charts

Year-end charts

Certifications

References

2015 songs
House music songs